Marshall Bennett (c. 1915 – October 13, 2018) was an American real estate developer who is credited with developing the modern industrial park.

Biography
Bennett was born to a Jewish family in Chicago and raised in the South Shore neighborhood. He served in the U.S. Navy during World War II and is a graduate of the University of Chicago. In the 1950s, Bennett partnered with Louis S. Kahnweiler and Jay Pritzker to develop the Centex Industrial Park in Elk Grove Village.

Bennett served on the board of the East-West Institute; and co-founded the Chicago Ten which brought Jewish, Christian, and Muslim leaders together promote economic-based solutions for peace in the Middle East. In 2002, he founded the Marshall Bennett Institute of Real Estate at Roosevelt University. Bennet hosted the "Marshall Bennett Classic" at his home in Sun Valley, Idaho which brought together the Top 100 real developers across the United States.

Personal life
In 1948, he married Arlene Gettelman; they had two children: Alice Bennett Groh and Bija Bennett. He died on October 13, 2018 at his home in the Gold Coast neighborhood of Chicago. Services were held at Congregation Solel in Highland Park, Illinois.

References

1910s births
2018 deaths
American real estate businesspeople
20th-century American Jews
Businesspeople from Chicago
20th-century American businesspeople
21st-century American Jews